Paradise (translit. Paradeisos) is a 2011 Greek romance film directed by Panagiotis Fafoutis. The film follows four interconnected stories around a carnival float of street parade.

Cast
 Natasa Zaga as Marianna
 Mihalis Fotopoulos as Mihalis
 Olia Lazaridou as Vicky
 Errikos Litsis as Ilias
 Christos Loulis as Sokratis
 Konstadinos Avarikiotis as Nikos
 Maria Skoula as Evgenia
 Andreas Konstantinou as Antonis
 Lila Mpaklesi as Panagiota
 Vangelis Alexandris as Fantasmas
 Thanasis Vlavianos as Patis
 Liza Neohoriti as Krystallina

References

External links
 

2011 films
2011 romantic drama films
Greek romantic drama films
2010s Greek-language films